Erwin Tomash (November 17, 1921 – December 10, 2012) was an American engineer who co-founded Dataproducts Corporation, which specialized in computer technology, specifically printers and core memory units. He is recognized for his early pioneering work with computer equipment peripherals. Tomash led the creation of the Charles Babbage Institute and is responsible for The Adelle and Erwin Tomash Fellowship in the History of Information Technology and The Erwin Tomash Library. He died at age 91 in his home in Soquel, California due to complications from Alzheimer's disease.

Education

Born and raised in Saint Paul, Minnesota, Erwin Tomash graduated from the University of Minnesota with his electrical engineering degree in 1943.

Early life
Upon graduating from the University of Minnesota, Tomash joined the U.S. Army Signal Corps, where he worked with radar, and was awarded the Bronze Star for his wartime activities. Following his time with the Army Signal Corps, Tomash served at the Naval Ordnance Laboratory briefly, before joining the Engineering Research Associates. As a research associate, he worked on developing electronic computers, including the ERA 1103 or UNIVAC Scientific. In 1956, he joined Telemeter Magnetic in Los Angeles where he became the company's president. He then oversaw Telemeter Magnetics' design of core memories for computers and in 1962 left Telemeter Magnetic, and co-founded Dataproducts Corporation.

Dataproducts Corporation

Dataproducts Corporation was co-founded by Erwin Tomash in 1962, and specialized in computer peripherals, with a focus on printers. In 1966, core memory was added to the product line, and due to its resulting expansion, the company relocated to Woodland Hills, Los Angeles, California in 1968. The company acquired Staff Dynamics, a personnel agency, and Uptime, a manufacturer of card readers; it also served as an incubator for Informatics, an early software company. By 1970 the company had become the world's leading independent printer manufacturer. In 1980 Tomash retired and Graham Tyson, already chief operating officer and president, succeeded him as chairman.

Awards/Accomplishments

In 1987 Erwin Tomash was honored by the IEEE Computer Society, and received the Computer Entrepreneur Award in recognition of his early pioneering work with computer peripherals.

Erwin and his wife Adelle Tomash were instrumental in establishing the Charles Babbage Institute, which honorably named a highly regarded library, archives, and a fellowship program after them, as well as the CBI Tomash computer history reprint series.

Erwin and Adelle Tomash, as well as the Tomash Family Foundation, were recognized in a 2009-2010 philanthropy report by the University of California, Santa Cruz (UCSC) as having contributed a gift of $1,000 or more to specific programs at the university.

The Erwin Tomash Library

The Erwin Tomash Library on The History of Computing is an annotated and illustrated catalog documenting a collection of books and manuscripts related to the history of computing.  It was assembled, over the course of many years, by Erwin Tomash using his knowledge as a pioneer in the development of computers. The collection consists of over five thousand items from twelfth century manuscripts to modern publications, and documents the rarest items together with a series of essays that explain the uses of little known instruments and techniques that are discussed in the entries. Each entry consists of the bibliographic details, some biographical information on the author, a description of the contents, and illustrations of interesting pages and diagrams. The library catalog, almost 1600 pages long, can be found on the IEEE Computer Society website as well as the CBI website.  A portion of the Erwin Tomash Library (post-1954 volumes) was donated to CBI and is publicly accessible there at the University of Minnesota.

The contents of the Erwin Tomash library were sold at auction by Sotheby's in London in September 2018. The copy of Galileo's Difesa contro alle Calunnie et Imposture di Baldessar Capra Milanese (1607), with a handwritten inscription by Galileo, sold for £466,000 (US$616,378).

The Tomash Fellowship

The Adelle and Erwin Tomash Fellowship in the History of Information Technology is awarded to a graduate student for doctoral dissertation research in the history of computing.  The fellowship is to be held at the recipient's home academic institution, the Charles Babbage Institute, or any other location with appropriate research facilities. It is intended for students who have completed all requirements for the doctoral degree except the research and writing of the dissertation.

References

External links
 Erwin Tomash Collection of Dataproducts Corporation Records (1962-82), Charles Babbage Institute, University of Minnesota.  Original business plan, publications, reports, organizational charts and employee lists, articles, and correspondence that document the company's growth and market position in printers and core memories.
 Oral history interview with Erwin Tomash.  Oral history interview by Robina Mapstone, 14 March and 5 April 1973, Woodland Hills, Calif. Charles Babbage Institute, University of Minnesota.  Tomash discusses his work with Engineering Research Associates (ERA), including the firm's management, the roles of William Norris, Frank Mullaney, and Arnold Cohen in ERA, Tomash's development of West Coast marketing for ERA after it became a part of Remington Rand, competition with International Business Machines, the development of Williams tube storage devices and core memory, and the ERA 1103 computer. He also recounts his move to Telemeter Magnetics, later Ampex Computer Products, the formation of Dataproducts Corporation and its subsidiary, Informatics Inc., headed by Walter F. Bauer.
 Oral history interview with Erwin Tomash.  Oral history interview by Arthur L. Norberg, 15 May 1983, Los Angeles, California. Charles Babbage Institute, University of Minnesota, Minneapolis.  Tomash discusses his career, including employment at Engineering Research Associates (ERA) and the founding of Dataproducts. He begins with his electrical engineering education at the University of Minnesota in the early 1940s and his subsequent entry into the Army Signal Corps as a radar specialist. Tomash recalls his departure in 1956 from Remington Rand to Telemeter Magnetics, where he soon became president. This company manufactured core memory systems and one of the first successful transistor memory systems. Tomash explains how he used the organization he and others had assembled from Telemeter Magnetics to found Dataproducts Corporation in 1962.
 Adelle and Erwin Tomash Fellowship in the History of Information Technology.  Charles Babbage Institute, University of Minnesota.  Fellowship is awarded annually to a graduate student for doctoral dissertation research in the history of computing.
 CBI–Tomash Reprint Series in the History of Computing.  Charles Babbage Institute, University of Minnesota.  Reprints, with an expert's introduction, of difficult-to-obtain monographs, conference proceedings, manuals, and government reports.
 Erwin Tomash and Michael R. Williams, The Erwin Tomash Library on the History of Computing: An Annotated and Illustrated Catalog.  Charles Babbage Institute, University of Minnesota.  Published in 2008, this 1600-page catalog describes in detail Erwin Tomash's extensive library documenting the origins of computing. The books date from 1180 to 1955 and include information about all forms of reckoning and other aids to calculation.  Each entry consists of bibliographic details, biographical information on the author, and a description of the contents, and there are many illustrations of interesting pages and diagrams.  Tomash's post-1955 books were donated to the Charles Babbage Institute and are catalogued and publicly accessible

1921 births
2012 deaths
20th-century American Jews
American people of Russian-Jewish descent
American people of Romanian-Jewish descent
University of Minnesota College of Science and Engineering alumni
People from Saint Paul, Minnesota
People from Soquel, California
American electrical engineers
21st-century American Jews
United States Army personnel of World War II
Deaths from dementia in California
Deaths from Alzheimer's disease